Knysna is a town with 76,150 inhabitants (2019 mid-year estimates) in the Western Cape province of South Africa. and is one of the destinations on the loosely defined Garden Route tourist route. It lies at 34° 2' 6.3168'' S and 23° 2' 47.2884'' E., and is situated 60 kilometres east of the city of George on the N2 highway, and 33 kilometres west of the Plettenberg Bay on the same road.

History

Early history
Forty fossilised hominid footprints, dating to about 90,000 years ago, along with various other archaeological discoveries suggest that humans have lived in Knysna for well over 300,000 years. The first of these were various San Hunter-gatherer peoples who inhabited most of Southern Africa in paleolithic. The San were gradually displaced and absorbed by south migrating Khoekhoe peoples.

Houtunqua (Outeniqua) Khoe
The indigenous inhabitants of the Knysna area are a southern Khoekhoe people called the Houtunqua or Outeniqua. Their name means "The People Who Bear Honey". From the Khoekhoegowab words ‘/hao ‘honeyʼ, tun'(teni) verb ‘to carryʼ, and khoe rendered as qua meaning ‘peopleʼ.

Little is known about Houtunqua society prior to European contact. What little historical sources exist are not elaborate. It is suspected that at the height of the Houtunqua's society territory stretched from the mouth of the Krom River in the east, along the Outeniqua Mountains which bear their name, up until the mouth of the Grootbrak River in the west.

The Houtunqua seem to have remained autonomous from the Inqua (Hamcumqua) expansion in the north with smaller Khoekhoe tribes like the Gamtobaqua coming into the fold of the Houtunqua to seek protection from the ever expanding Inqua to the north east. The Houtunqua were connected to trades routes with the Attaqua and Hessequa to the west.

Archaeological evidence suggests that the Houtunqua kept livestock and practiced Nomadic Pastoralism but made extensive use of the resources in mountain forests. Excavations in the region have unearthed many caves showing signs of pre-colonial occupation.The discovery of shell middens at Knoetzie beach confirms the idea that like other Khoekhoe peoples, the Houtuniqua made use of the ocean for its resources.

Oral tradition among the Houtunqua tells how the Houtunqua held specific superstitions about Europeans and believed them to be "baleful spirits". Thus the Houtunqua went out of their way to avoid contact with Europeans. Where other Khoekhoe tribes established formal relations and trade with Europeans, the Houtunqua receded deeper and deeper into the mountain forests. As a result the Houtunqua disappeared from the historical record for some time with some Houtunqua eventually assimilating into colonial society of the time. Chief Dikkop, who died in 1816, was the last recorded Chief of the Houtunqua.

Origins of the name 
A number of explanations exist for the origins of the name, 'Knysna' - including ‘xthys xna,’ purportedly from a Khoekhoe language term that night mean have meant ‘place of timber’, ‘place of ferns’, or even ‘straight down’ (referring to the cliffs at The Heads). However, it is also likely that the name is related to, or a derivative of, similar place names that do or have existed in other parts of Africa. In colonial times Lake Malawi was known as Lake Nyasa (very similar to 'Knysna'), while Webster's Universal Unabridged Dictionary  defines the word ‘nyanza’ as a noun `"(African): An expanse of water, as a lake or wide river".

European settlement

The first Europeans arrived in the area in 1760, and the farm Melkhoutkraal (literally translating from Afrikaans as 'milk wood kraal’) was established on the eastern shore of the Knysna Lagoon. Stephanus Terblans, the first European farmer to settle in the area, was given a loan permit to farm here in 1770.

Upon moving to Knysna George Rex, a British-born entrepreneur credited as being the founder of Knysna, acquired the loan rights to Melkhoutkraal in 1804 and later, in 1816, to the farm Welbedacht, which he renamed Eastford. He gave  of Eastford to the Colonial Government, on which the Royal Navy established the township of Melville. Rex’s properties were sold when he died in 1839.

In April 1817, the transport brig , belonging to the Cape Town Dockyard, was the first European vessel to enter the Knysna heads. She struck a rock, now known as Emu Rock, and was holed. Her crew ran Emu ashore to prevent her sinking. In late April  arrived to render assistance. After surveying the area, Podargus sailed safely into the Knysna and retrieved Emus cargo.

The next major settler in Knysna was Captain Thomas Henry Duthie, who married Caroline, George Rex’s daughter, and bought a portion of the Uitzigt farm from his father-in-law which Rex had named Belvidere. The construction of a small Norman-style church was commissioned by Duthie on his property, and was consecrated in 1855. The settlement’s population grew slowly, and Englishmen such as Henry Barrington and Lt. Col. John Sutherland, who established the settlement of Newhaven on a portion of purchased land, settled in the area. At the time, Knysna was a field cornetcy of Plettenberg Bay within the Magisterial Division of George. In 1858, Knysna became a separate Magisterial Division, new stores and accommodation facilities were opened, and Knysna became the new commercial centre of the region.

On their way to New Zealand, the Thesen family who were travelling from Norway fancied the little hamlet of Knysna so much that they decided to stay, bringing with them their knowledge of commerce and sailing. Soon, timber was being exported to the Cape from the vast areas of forest surrounding Knysna, and a steam sawmill and small shipyard were established. Later, these were relocated to Paarden Island, later known as Thesen's Island.

Millwood Gold Rush

In 1878, an important discovery was made in the area. A gold nugget was found in the Karatara River, near Ruigtevlei. Soon fortune hunters from all over the world arrived at the Millwood Forest in search of gold, and Millwood grew into a bustling town. Millwood was declared a gold field, the first in South Africa. However, soon not enough gold was being recovered to sustain a growing town, and the mining industry in the area collapsed. Some miners relocated to Knysna, bringing their little homes with them. One of the houses, known as 'Millwood House', now functions as a museum.

Amalgamation and timber industry

By 1880 over 1000 people had settled in Knysna. In 1882, the settlements of Newhaven, Melville and the "wedge" of land between the two villages were amalgamated to form the municipality of 'The Knysna', named after the Knysna River.

Knysna's timber industry peaked when George Parkes arrived from Britain and saw the opportunity to use the hardwoods of the Knysna Forest for export to elsewhere in the country, and even overseas. He established the Knysna Forest Company, later renamed Geo. Parkes and Sons Ltd., which is still trading to this day.

2017 Knysna fire 
On June 7, 2017, fueled by strong winds from a severe storm - the Cape Storm of 2017- coming in from the west, a fire swept through the town and surrounding areas. Killing 9 as a direct result of the fires and another 2 indirectly and displacing around 10,000 people from all walks of life. Initially reported as arson, the cause of the fire was later revealed to have been arson.

Geography

The town is primarily built on the northern shore of a large warm-water estuary, known as the Knysna Lagoon, which is fed by the Knysna River. The estuary opens to the ocean after passing between two large headlands made up of Peninsula Formation quartzites. These are popularly known as "The Heads", and have become infamous due to the loss of boats and fishermen passing through their treacherous and unpredictable waters. The Paquita, a German vessel, sank on the eastern side of the Knysna Heads in 1903. Near them are geological formations, known locally as "The Map Stones." To the north of Knysna, Afro-Montane or temperate rainforest covers the hilly terrain for 20 km until changing to fynbos or macchia high in the Outeniqua Mountains. The eastern head is heavily developed, while the western head is partially protected by a private nature reserve, Featherbed Nature Reserve, developed and formerly owned by teacher and television presenter William Smith on land he inherited from his father, famed ichthyologist J. L. B. Smith.

Climate

Knysna has an oceanic climate (Cfb in the Köppen climate classification). Summers are warm and winters mild. Knysna has one of the richest rainfall percentages in South Africa with the wettest time of year being between June and August. Knysna stays green in all seasons, and its temperate climate makes it a tourist destination all year round.

Education
Keurbosch International Cambridge School
Knysna High School 
Knysna Primary School 
Knysna Montessori 
Oakhill College 
Heatherhill School - International curriculum
Stepping Stones (Grade 1–3) 
Fraaisig Primary 
Percy Madala Secondary School
Knysna Secondary School
Knysna Concordia High School

Tourism

The town is a popular destination for both tourists and senior citizens entering retirement, especially among the British and former expatriates due to the year-round warm climate. Recently, the town has also become a preferred destination among golfers, as the town boasts several world class golf courses, including Pezula Golf Course, Simola Golf Course and the well established Knysna Golf Course situated on the lagoon. It is near the towns of Plettenberg Bay and George, where there are airports. Knysna is also home to Mitchell's Brewery although the company no longer brews beers in the town. The forest, rivers, estuary, and ocean surrounding the town are dotted with hiking trails and plenty of opportunities for outdoor activities. Hikers, runners, kayakers, swimmers, and fishermen are known to be particularly fond of Knysna.

Annual events
Knysna hosts a variety of annual events, which draw local and international visitors alike. Such events include the Knysna Oyster Festival in late June and/or early July; the Pink Loerie Mardi Gras and Arts Festival at the end of April and/or beginning of May; the Knysna Speed Festival takes place in the first week of May, the highlight of the week being the Simola Hillclimb, currently sponsored by Jaguar South Africa. The Rastafarian Earth Festival takes place at the end of July, celebrating Rastafarian religion, culture and lifestyle.

Knysna Oyster Festival

The Knysna Oyster Festival, held annually in late June/early July, is the town's biggest event. The duration of the festival is ten days. It was first held in 1983.  Approximately 200,000 oysters are consumed over the 10-day period. Many sporting activities take place, such as rugby, golf, bowls, squash, cycling and marathons. The Knysna Forest Marathon and Half Marathon, as well as the Rotary Cycle Tour, draw many sporting enthusiasts to the town. The COVID-19 pandemic deferred the 2020 festival to 2021.

Knysna Speed Festival
The best-known hillclimb event in South Africa is held annually in early May during the Knysna Speed Festival, currently known as The Jaguar Simola Hillclimb. It is a three-day event, with Classic Car Friday reserved for cars built prior to 1980 and restricted to 60 entries. The King of the Hill Challenge (limited to 84 entries), for unrestricted cars in various classes, takes place over the weekend. The Saturday is for practice and pre-qualifying, while Sunday features the "hot" cars taking on final qualifying and the final runs. The course length is  up Simola Hill. It is very fast with the 2016 winning average speed being .. 2021 will be the eleventh running of the event which was founded in 2009. There was no event in 2013 nor 2020.

Coats of arms

Municipal arms
The Knysna municipality assumed a coat of arms in 1959, and registered them with the Cape Provincial Administration on 24 June 1960.

The arms, which were designed by Ivan Mitford-Barberton, are: Quarterly, I Or a white horse's head couped at the neck proper; II Azure a fern frond in bend sinister Argent; III Azure a yellowwood tree Or;  IV Or an elephant's head caboshed proper (in layman's terms: the shield is quartered, 1 a white horse's head on a gold background, 2 a silver fern frond on a blue background, 3 a yellowwood tree on a blue background and 4 an elephant's head on a gold background). The crest is a sailing ship, and the motto Concilio et prudentia.

Divisional council arms
The Knysna divisional council (the local authority for the rural areas outside the town) assumed a coat of arms in 1961 and registered them with the provincial administration on 28 July 1961.

The arms, designed by Schalk Pienaar, were: Per saltire, I Or on a mount Vert a stinkwood tree proper; II & III Argent three bars wavy Azure; IV Vert the brig Knysna proper the sails charged with two lions rampant Gules and pennants flotant Azure. In layman's terms: the shield is divided into four sections by two diagonal lines, the top section displays a stinkwood tree on a golden background, the left and right sections display three wavy blue stripes against a silver background, and the bottom section displays a brig named 'Knysna' with red lions on the sails and a blue pennant flying from the mast. The motto was Pulchra terra Dei donum.

Notable people 
 Thomas Henry Duthie (1806–1857) – landowner, supervisor of Crown Forests and Lands
 Warrick Gelant (born 1995) - South African professional rugby union player
 Caspar Lee (born 1994) – YouTube personality
 Rudolf Eric Koertzen (born 1949) – international cricket umpire
 D. C. S. Oosthuizen (1926–1969) – philosopher, a critic of Apartheid; born here
 George Rex (1765–1839) – founder of Knysna, landowner and timber merchant
 Eric Robinson (1891–1982) – opened first private veterinary practice in Knysna
 William Smith (born 1939) – television science and mathematics teacher
 Charles Wilhelm Thesen (1856–1940) – shipowner and timber merchant
 Alan Winde (born 1965) – 8th Premier of the Western Cape
 Josh Pieters (born 1993) – YouTube personality

See also
 Knysna Municipality, Western Cape
 Knysna-Amatole montane forests
 Knysna elephants
 Knysna Yacht Club
 Knysna seahorse
 List of heritage sites in Knysna
 Fiela's Child
 Dalene Matthee

Citations

References
Horsburgh, James (1826) India Directory, Or Directions for Sailing to and from the East Indies, China, New Holland, Cape of Good Hope, Brazil and the Interjacent Ports. 3. Ed, Vol. 1. (Kingsburg).

External links

Knysna Municipality
Knysna Tourism Bureau
A Brief History of Knysna 1770–1890 – Philip Caveney

 
Maritime history of South Africa
Populated places in the Knysna Local Municipality
Populated places established in 1871
1871 establishments in the Cape Colony